The Church of St. Mark is the parish church of old Zagreb, Croatia, located in St. Mark's Square. It is one of the oldest architectural monuments in Zagreb.

Overview

The Romanesque window found in its south facade is the best evidence that the church must have been built as early as the 13th century as is also the semicircular ground-plan of St. Mary's chapel (later altered).

In the second half of the 14th century, the church was radically reconstructed. It was then turned into a late Gothic church of the three-nave type.

Massive round columns support heavy ribbed vaults cut in stone and an air of peace and sublimity characterizes the church interior in its simplicity. The most valuable part of St. Mark's Church is its south portal, considered to be the work of sculptors of the Parler family from Prague (end of the 14th century).

The Gothic composition of the portal consists of fifteen effigies placed in eleven shallow niches. On top are the statues of Joseph and Mary with the infant Jesus, and below them one can see St. Mark and the Lion; the Twelve Apostles are placed on both sides of the portal (four wooden statues replaced the original ones which had been destroyed). In its artistic composition and the number of statues, this portal is the richest and the most valuable Gothic portal in southern Central Europe.

Outside, on the northwest wall of the church lies the oldest coat of arms of Zagreb with the year 1499 engraved in it (the original is kept in the Zagreb City Museum).

On the roof, tiles are laid so that they represent the coat of arms of Zagreb (white castle on red background) and Triune Kingdom of Croatia, Slavonia and Dalmatia.

As the corner of St. Mark's Square and the present day Street of Ćiril and Metod, was a Town Hall, the seat of the city administration in medieval times. The building has gone through a number of alteration and reconstruction phases, and today this old Town Hall still keeps its doors open for the meetings of the Zagreb City Council.

Gallery

See also
 History of Zagreb
 Zagreb Cathedral
 Kaptol
 Gradec

References

Further reading

External links

 Guide.ndo.co.uk
 Mfa.hr

Saint Marks Church, Zagreb
Religious buildings and structures in Zagreb
Gornji Grad–Medveščak
Gothic architecture in Croatia
Church of Saint Mark, Zagreb